Andriy Poltavtsev (born 7 December 1991) is a Ukrainian football goalkeeper who plays for FC Nikopol.

Career
Poltavtsev is a product of the Luhansk Youth Sportive School Systems.

He played during 7 years in FC Zorya reserve team and made his debut for FC Zorya in the match against FC Olimpik Donetsk on 28 February 2015 in the Ukrainian Premier League.

References

External links 

Ukrainian footballers
FC Zorya Luhansk players
FC Kramatorsk players
Association football goalkeepers
Ukrainian Premier League players
Ukrainian Second League players
1991 births
Living people
Place of birth missing (living people)
FC Guria Lanchkhuti players
Ukrainian expatriate footballers
Expatriate footballers in Georgia (country)
Ukrainian expatriate sportspeople in Georgia (country)
FC Enerhiya Nova Kakhovka players
FC Nikopol players